Thames Chase is a community forest of 9842 hectares (24,320 acres/38 square miles)  located in 47 sites in London and Essex, England. Its stated aim is "to renew and regenerate the landscape at the edge of East London and South Essex by creating Thames Chase, the Community Forest: a varied wooded landscape for local people to influence, create, use, enjoy and cherish".

It has been managed as a community forest since 1990.

List of sites
 London Borough of Havering
 Berwick Glades
 Berwick Woods
 Bonnetts Wood
 Hornchurch Country Park
 Pages Wood
 Ingrebourne Valley
 Parklands
 London Borough of Barking and Dagenham
 Central Park
 Eastbrookend Country Park
 The Chase Nature Reserve
 Bretons Outdoor Centre
 Beam Valley Country Park
 Essex
 in the Brentwood area:
 Shenfield Common
 Thorndon Country Park
 three sites near Warley
 the Mardyke Valley running from near Brentwood to the River Thames at Purfleet (four sites)
 in the Aveley area, six sites, including Belhus Country Park and Kennington Park

Thames Chase Joint Committee
The Thames Chase Joint Committee oversees development of the community forest. It comprises three members each from:
 Barking and Dagenham London Borough Council
 Brentwood Borough Council
 Essex County Council
 Havering London Borough Council
 Thurrock Council

References

External links
 Official website

Forests and woodlands of Essex
Parks and open spaces in the London Borough of Barking and Dagenham
Parks and open spaces in the London Borough of Havering
Thurrock
Urban forests in the United Kingdom